The African sea catfish (Arius africanus), also known as the marine catfish, is a species of sea catfish in the family Ariidae. It was described by Albert Günther in 1867. It is found in tropical brackish and freshwater in Tanzania, Madagascar, and the Pangani River.

The diet of the African sea catfish consists of small finfish and invertebrates. It is of commercial interest to fisheries.

References

Arius (fish)
Fish described in 1867
Taxa named by Albert Günther